Dharma Pathini is a 1986 Indian Tamil-language legal drama film, directed by Ameerjan, starring Karthik and Jeevitha. The film was remade in Telugu as Dharmapatni and in Hindi as Jawab Hum Denge.

Plot

Prem Kumar is an honest police inspector who comes in conflict with a dangerous thug named DJ. He falls in love with Vidhya who joins as Sub-Inspector of Police in his station. They get married. Situations take a turn when Vidhya's brother-in-law is framed in a murder case. The rest of the story is how Prem Kumar and Vidhya tackle the case and reveal the true murderers.

Cast
 Karthik as Inspector Prem Kumar
 Jeevitha as Vidhya
 Goundamani "Podhuppani" Ponnusaami
 Radha Ravi as D. Janardhanan aka DJ 
 Poornam Viswanathan as Kamalanathan, Retd. IG
 Chandrasekhar as Prabhakar
 Charle as MLA Palayam
 Senthil as Ponnusaami's sidekick
 Visu as Lawyer "Vicks" Vardarajan
 Kishmu as Public Prosecutor Dakshinamoorthy
 Ilaiyaraaja in a special appearance for the song "Naan Thedum Sevanthi Poovithu"

Soundtrack 
The music was composed by Ilaiyaraaja, All lyrics were written by Vaali, Vairamuthu, Kanmani Subbu, Na. Kamarasan, Chidambaranathan. The song "Naan Thedum" is set in Hindolam raga.

References

External links
 

1986 films
Indian action films
Films scored by Ilaiyaraaja
1980s Tamil-language films
Tamil films remade in other languages
Fictional portrayals of the Tamil Nadu Police
Films directed by Ameerjan
1986 action films